Namdaemun Market is a large traditional market in Seoul, South Korea. The market is located next to Namdaemun, the "Great South Gate," which was the main southern gate to the old city. It is the oldest and largest market in Korea.

History 
Namdaemun market dates back to 1414, during the reign of King Taejong, as a government-managed marketplace. In 1608, King Seonjo set up the office of seonhyecheong (hangul: 선혜청, hanja: 宣惠廳, "tribute bureau") in the district to manage the tributes of rice, cloth and money. A trading marketplace took its form around that time and commercial activities flourished as traders set up various shops. Trade was active in grains, fish, fruit, and miscellaneous goods.

The management of the market went over to the Japanese in 1922, but after liberation in 1945 the merchants established the Namdaemun Merchant Organization and took over management. The market, however, turned to ruins during the Korean War and succumbed to fire in 1953. The Seoul Namdaemun Market Co. Ltd. was founded in 1954 to rebuild the market, but efforts fell short due to financial troubles. Endeavors for reconstruction continued in the following years, but fires swept the market again in 1968 and 1975.

The city of Seoul announced plans to renovate the market in 2007, and reconstruction and renovations are being continued in 2010.

Characteristics 

Namdaemun Market is one of the oldest continually running markets in South Korea, and one of the largest retail markets in Seoul. The streets in which the market is located were built in a time when cars were not prevalent, so the market itself is not accessible by car. The main methods of transporting goods into and out of the market are by motorcycle and hand-drawn carts. It occupies many city blocks, which are blocked off from most car traffic due to the prevalence of parking congestion in the area. The market can be reached by subway or bus; the location is within a 10-minute walk from Seoul Station and is even closer to the subway Hoehyeon station, Line 4.

Much of the market is outside, but there are also many stores which line the streets. Many retailers buy their items, particularly clothing, at wholesale prices at Namdaemun, to resell in their own stores in other cities. Namdaemun is a popular tourist attraction. The Market is on the Seoul list of Asia's 10 greatest street food cities for the hotteok.

See also 
 Shopping in Seoul
 List of markets in South Korea
 List of South Korean tourist attractions

References 

Namdaemun Market (남대문시장) || South Korea
https://www.youtube.com/watch?v=jPsXxB1QhsE

External links 

 Namdaemun : Official Seoul City Tourism
 Korean Tourism Organization's site for Namdaemun Market
 Namdaemun Market 

Jung District, Seoul
Shopping districts and streets in South Korea
Retail markets in Seoul
Food markets in South Korea